Rana Munawar Hussain (also known by the name Rana Munawar Ghous Khan) is a Pakistani politician who was a Member of the Provincial Assembly of the Punjab, from 2008 to May 2018 and from August 2018 to January 2023.

Early life and education
He was born on 1 April 1972 in Sargodha.

He graduated from University of Sargodha in 1991.

Political career
He was elected to the Provincial Assembly of the Punjab as a candidate of Pakistan Peoples Party from Constituency PP-36 (Sarghoda-IX) in 2008 Pakistani general election. He received 33,221 votes and defeated Faisal Javaid Ghuman, a candidate of Pakistan Muslim League (Q).

He was re-elected to the Provincial Assembly of the Punjab as a candidate of Pakistan Muslim League (N) (PML-N) from Constituency PP-36 (Sarghoda-IX) in 2013 Pakistani general election.

He was re-elected to Provincial Assembly of the Punjab as a candidate of PML-N from Constituency PP-79 (Sargodha-VIII) in 2018 Pakistani general election.

References

Living people
Punjab MPAs 2013–2018
Punjab MPAs 2008–2013
1972 births
Pakistan Muslim League (N) MPAs (Punjab)
Punjab MPAs 2018–2023